Rayssa Costa (born 16 March 1991) is a Brazilian fencer. She competed in the women's épée event at the 2016 Summer Olympics.

References

External links
 

1991 births
Living people
Brazilian female épée fencers
Olympic fencers of Brazil
Fencers at the 2016 Summer Olympics
Place of birth missing (living people)
Pan American Games medalists in fencing
Pan American Games bronze medalists for Brazil
South American Games silver medalists for Brazil
South American Games medalists in fencing
Fencers at the 2015 Pan American Games
Competitors at the 2010 South American Games
Medalists at the 2015 Pan American Games
21st-century Brazilian women